Resident Evil is a Japanese video game and other media franchise.

Resident Evil may also refer to:

List of Resident Evil media including:
Resident Evil (1996 video game), the PlayStation video game, later re-released on several other platforms
Resident Evil (2002 video game), the GameCube remake, later re-released on several other platforms
Resident Evil (film series)
Resident Evil (film), the first film of the series
Resident Evil (TV series)
"Resident Evil" (The Vampire Diaries), an episode of the TV series The Vampire Diaries